Dobindol (in older sources Dobni Dol) is a settlement in the Municipality of Dolenjske Toplice in Slovenia. The area is part of the historical region of Lower Carniola. The municipality is now included in the Southeast Slovenia Statistical Region.

A small chapel-shrine on the eastern edge of the settlement was built in 1919.

References

External links
Dobindol on Geopedia

Populated places in the Municipality of Dolenjske Toplice